The Badische Eschach is a river in Baden-Württemberg, Germany. It flows into the Fischbach in Niedereschach.

See also
List of rivers of Baden-Württemberg

References

Rivers of Baden-Württemberg
Rivers of Germany

de:Eschach (Neckar)#Badische Eschach